The 1969 Motor Trend 500 was a NASCAR Grand National Series event that was held on February 1, 1969, at Riverside International Raceway in Riverside, California.

The transition to purpose-built racecars began in the early 1960s and occurred gradually over that decade.  Changes made to the sport by the late 1960s brought an end to the "strictly stock" vehicles of the 1950s.

The Permatex 200 for sportsman cars was run as a companion event. The winner after a 10 year break from motorsports was Hershel McGriff, 2nd was Ron Grable, followed by Clem Proctor, J.R. Skinner and Vic Irvan, Ron Hornaday Sr. was 6th.

Race report
One hundred and eighty-six laps were done on a paved road course spanning . This was the first time Petty won a race in any car other than a Plymouth and the first time he ran a Cup race in any car but a Plymouth since he switched to the Mopar brand from Oldsmobile near the end of 1959.

More than forty-six thousand fans would watch 44 vehicles start and only 13 finish the race. Most of the DNFs were caused by engine issues.  Ford vehicles and Chevrolet vehicles made up most of the starting grid. Other notable drivers included: LeeRoy Yarbrough, Ray Elder, Neil Castles, Mario Andretti (his final start), and Elmo Langley. Al Unser would get his last top-five finish at this event, he wouldn't make another NASCAR Grand National Series start until 1986. Engine reliability was awful during this race, approximately 25% of the racing grid was afflicted with engine failures and mechanical issues.

Notable crew chiefs at the race were Harry Hyde, Dale Inman, Glen Wood, and Jake Elder.

West Coast racer Marty Kinerk made his top NASCAR Series debut at this event.

The entire race was completed under the green flag without any laps being taken for either yellow or red flags; with the final race to go the entire distance without a caution was the 2002 EA Sports 500. Average speeds for the entire race approached  and the duration of the race was four hours, forty-five minutes, and thirty-seven seconds. The race's top prize would be $19,650 in American dollars ($ when adjusted for inflation). The overall winnings of this race would be $79,660 in American dollars ($ when adjusted for inflation).

While individual owners would make up the majority of the NASCAR teams during this era, multi-car teams like Holman Moody, Wood Brothers Racing, and K&K Insurance Racing began to emerge during the late 1960s and early 1970s.

Qualifying

Finishing order
Section reference:

 Richard Petty
 A. J. Foyt
 David Pearson
 Al Unser
 James Hylton
 LeeRoy Yarbrough*
 Ray Elder
 Scott Cain
 John Sears
 Harold Hardesty
 Ray Johnstone
 Dick Bown
 Neil Castles
 Henley Gray
 Bobby Allison*
 Ranny Dodd*
 Marvin Sjolin
 Mario Andretti*
 Elmo Langley*
 Paul Dorrity*
 Don Tarr*
 Roger McCluskey*
 Wendell Parnell*
 Cale Yarborough*
 Frank Burnett*
 Dan Gurney*
 Sam Rose*
 Robert Link*
 J.D. McDuffie*
 Cliff Garner*
 Jerry Oliver*
 Ralph Arnold*
 Don White*
 Marty Kinerk*
 Jack McCoy*
 Robert Hale*
 Parnelli Jones*
 Bobby Isaac*
 Guy Jones*
 Dave James*
 Joe Frasson*
 Jim Cook*
 Johnny Steele*
 Bob England*

* Driver failed to finish race

Timeline
Section reference:
 Start of race: A.J. Foyt had the pole position to begin the event.
 Lap 28: LeeRoy Yarbrough took over the lead from A.J. Foyt.
 Lap 29: Mario Andretti took over the lead from LeeRoy Yarbrough.
 Lap 32: A.J. Foyt took over the lead from Mario Andretti.
 Lap 41: Don White blew his vehicle's engine while racing at high speeds.
 Lap 43: Ralph Arnold blew his vehicle's engine while racing at high speeds.
 Lap 48: Cliff Garner blew his vehicle's engine while racing at high speeds.
 Lap 50: J.D. McDuffie blew his vehicle's engine while racing at high speeds.
 Lap 51: LeeRoy Yarbrough took over the lead from A.J. Foyt.
 Lap 58: Mario Andretti took over the lead from LeeRoy Yarbrough.
 Lap 62: A.J. Foyt took over the lead from Mario Andretti.
 Lap 65: Sam Rose managed to lose the rear end of his vehicle.
 Lap 66: Dan Gurney blew his vehicle's engine while racing at high speeds.
 Lap 78: Richard Petty took over the lead from A.J. Foyt.
 Lap 80: Frank Burnett managed to ruin his vehicle's transmission.
 Lap 81: Cale Yarbrough blew his vehicle's engine while racing at high speeds.
 Lap 83: LeeRoy Yarbrough took over the lead from Richard Petty.
 Lap 87: Wendell Parnell blew his vehicle's engine while racing at high speeds.
 Lap 89: Richard Petty took over the lead from LeeRoy Yarbrough.
 Lap 100: Roger McCluskey managed to overheat his vehicle while he was driving.
 Lap 110: Don Tarr noticed that his vehicle's transmission stopped working.
 Lap 129: Paul Dorrity blew his vehicle's engine while racing at high speeds.
 Lap 131: Elmo Langley blew his vehicle's engine while racing at high speeds.
 Lap 132: Mario Andretti blew his vehicle's engine while racing at high speeds.
 Lap 143: Ranny Dodd managed to lose the rear end of his vehicle; causing him to leave the race due to safety reasons.
 Lap 151: Bobby Allison managed to lose the rear end of his vehicle; causing him to leave the race due to safety reasons.
 Lap 177: LeeRoy Yarbrough blew his vehicle's engine while racing at high speeds.
 Finish: Richard Petty was officially declared the winner of the event.

References

Motor Trend 500
Motor Trend 500
NASCAR races at Riverside International Raceway